No. 6 Squadron  or 6th Squadron may refer to:

Aviation units
 No. 6 Squadron RAAF, a unit of the Royal Australian Air Force
 No. 6 Squadron (Finland)
 No. 6 Squadron, Indian Air Force
 No. 6 Squadron RNZAF, a unit of the Royal New Zealand Air Force
 No. 6 Squadron PAF, a unit of the Pakistan Air Force
 6 Squadron SAAF, a unit of the South African Air Force
 No. 6 Squadron RAF, a unit of the United Kingdom Royal Air Force
 6th Tactical Fighter Squadron (JASDF), Japan
 6th Tactical Squadron, Poland
 Fliegerstaffel 6, Swiss Air Force

United States
 6th Airlift Squadron
 6th Air Refueling Squadron
 6th Bombardment Squadron
 6th Bombardment Squadron, later 6th Air Refueling Squadron
 6th Intelligence Squadron
 6th Photographic Squadron
 6th Reconnaissance Squadron
 6th Reconnaissance Squadron (Medium)
 6th Special Operations Squadron
 6th Tactical Missile Squadron
 6th Weapons Squadron

Naval units
 6th Battle Squadron, United Kingdom
 6th Frigate Squadron, United Kingdom

Space units
 6th Space Operations Squadron, United States
 6th Space Warning Squadron, United States